Triclonella xanthota is a moth in the family Cosmopterigidae. It is found in Mexico.

References

Natural History Museum Lepidoptera generic names catalog

Cosmopteriginae
Moths of Central America
Moths described in 1912